Kevin Juergensen (born 1958) is a filmmaker, diver, and inventor best known for being the founder and CEO of Juergensen Marine. He was one of the first rebreather divers in the modern rebreather era and has logged hundreds of dives using the Mark 16 Rebreather which his company Juergensen Marine makes. He has produced over 27 underwater wildlife documentaries for the Discovery Channel. Juergensen was the President of Pacific Media Associates.

Juergensen is the recipient of the International Wildlife Film Festival lifetime achievement award, and was also selected as one of the Wyland Foundation "Who's Who".

Filmography

References

Underwater filmmakers
1958 births
Living people
People from San Pedro, Los Angeles